The Soacha River is a river on the Bogotá savanna and a left tributary of the Bogotá River.

Etymology 
Soacha is derived from Muysccubun, the indigenous language of the Muisca, who inhabited the Bogotá savanna before the Spanish conquest and means "man of the Sun".

Description 

The Soacha River originates in the eastern part of the locality of Bogotá Ciudad Bolívar. It flows through the municipality Soacha before flowing into the Bogotá River. The type locality of the Cacho Formation is located in the Soacha River basin.

See also 

List of rivers of Colombia
Bogotá savanna
Tunjuelo River

References

Bibliography

External links 
  Sistema Hídrico, Bogotá

Rivers of Colombia
Bogotá River
Geography of Cundinamarca Department
Rivers
Soacha